Chromolaena squalida  is a South American species of flowering shrub in the family Asteraceae. It is found in Brazil, Paraguay, Bolivia, Peru, Colombia, Venezuela, Guyana, Suriname.

Chromolaena squalida is a shrub with bristly stems. Leaves are opposite, green above but hairy underneath. The plant produces many small flower heads in a flat-topped array.

References

External links
photo of herbarium specimen at Missouri Botanical Garden, collected in Minas Gerais, Brazil
photo of herbarium specimen at Missouri Botanical Garden, collected in the Federal District, Brazil

squalida
Flora of South America
Plants described in 1836